Horace Charles Watt (6 March 1891 –  11 September 1969), sometimes known as Harry Watt, was an Australian rugby league player of the 1910s and 1920s. He won a premiership with Balmain in 1924.

Background
Watt was born in Balmain, Sydney, New South Wales, in 1891, the son of George and Elizabeth Watt. He came through the junior ranks to be graded with Balmain in 1917.

Playing career

Watt represented New South Wales on four occasions in 1919, 1921 and 1924. He also played three Tests for the Kangaroos against England in 1924.

Watt died on 11 September 1969 in Regents Park, Sydney, aged 78.

References

1891 births
1969 deaths
Balmain Tigers players
New South Wales rugby league team players
Australia national rugby league team players
Australian rugby league players
Rugby league players from Sydney